Quinagolide, sold under the brand name Norprolac, is a selective dopamine D2 receptor agonist which is used to reduce elevated levels of prolactin (hyperprolactinemia). It has also been found to be effective in the treatment of breast pain.

Chemistry
Quinagolide is a racemate composed of the following two enantiomers:

References

Benzoquinolines
D2-receptor agonists
Phenols
Prolactin inhibitors
Sulfamides
Tocolytics